Milena Venega Cancio (born 5 March 1997) is a Cuban rower.

Venega competed at the 2019 Pan American Games where she won bronze medals in the lightweight single sculls event and lightweight double sculls event alongside Rosana Serrano.

She competed at the 2020 Summer Olympics.

References

1997 births
Living people
Cuban female rowers
Rowers at the 2019 Pan American Games
Pan American Games medalists in rowing
Pan American Games bronze medalists for Cuba
Medalists at the 2019 Pan American Games
Olympic rowers of Cuba
Rowers at the 2020 Summer Olympics
21st-century Cuban women